The men's beach volleyball tournament at the 2020 Olympic Games in Tokyo, Japan, took place at the Shiokaze Park. The competition was held from 24 July to 7 August 2021. It was originally scheduled to take place from 25 July to 8 August 2020, but due to the COVID-19 pandemic, the IOC and the Tokyo 2020 Organising Committee announced on 24 March 2020 that the 2020 Summer Olympics would be delayed to 2021. Because of this pandemic, the games were played behind closed doors. Twenty four teams with 48 athletes around the world competed for the gold medal.

Anders Mol and Christian Sørum captured the gold medal after defeating Viacheslav Krasilnikov and Oleg Stoyanovskiy in the final, while Cherif Younousse and Ahmed Tijan took home bronze.

The medals for the competition were presented by Kristin Kloster Aasen, Norway; IOC Member, and the medalists' bouquets were presented by Ary Graça, Brazil; FIVB President.

Qualification

Teams
Twenty four teams were drawn in six pools of four teams.

*Taylor Crabb of the United States originally qualified to play with Gibb, but was tested positive for COVID-19 and was replaced by Bourne.

Draw
The draw was made on 5 July 2021.

Referees
The following referees were selected for the tournament.

 Osvaldo Sumavil
 Mário Ferro
 Wang Lijun
 Juan Carlos Saavedra
 Charalampos Papadogoulas
 Mariko Satomi
 Davide Crescentini
 Agnieszka Myszkowska
 Rui Carvalho
 Roman Pristovakin
 Giovanni Bake
 José María Padrón
 Brig Beatie

Preliminary round
All times are local (UTC+9).

Pool A

Pool B

Pool C

Pool D

Pool E

Pool F

Lucky losers
The table below shows the ranking of third-placed teams in the preliminary round. The top two teams advanced to next round automatically. The other teams competed for the two remaining spots. The third-ranked team played against the sixth-ranked team, and the fourth-ranked team played against the fifth-ranked team.

Lucky loser playoffs

Knockout stage
The round of sixteen pair up were determined by drawing of lots. The six first ranked teams in the preliminary pools were separated automatically. Then, the lucky loser playoffs winners were drawn. The two best third ranked were drawn next. And, the last drawing belonged to the second ranked teams. The teams from the same pool in the preliminary round could not meet in round of 16.

Bracket

Round of 16

Quarterfinals

Semifinals

Bronze medal game

Gold medal game

Final ranking

See also
Beach volleyball at the 2020 Summer Olympics – Women's tournament

Notes

References

External links
Official website

beach
2021 in beach volleyball
2020
Men's events at the 2020 Summer Olympics